GUI testing tools serve the purpose of automating the testing process of software with graphical user interfaces.

References 

 
GUI
Software comparisons